Poona is a coastal town and locality in the Fraser Coast Region, Queensland, Australia. In the  the locality of Poona had a population of 481 people.

History 
The town's name is derived from Poona Creek and Poona Point.

In the  the locality of Poona had a population of 481 people.

Education 
There are no schools in Poona. The nearest primary school is Granville State School in Granville, Maryborough, to the north-west. The nearest secondary school is Maryborough State High School in Maryborough to the north-west.

References 

Towns in Queensland
Fraser Coast Region
Coastline of Queensland
Localities in Queensland